Shifang is a county-level city in Sichuan, China, under administration of Deyang prefecture-level city. Shifang has a history stretching back over two thousand years. It suffered heavy damage during the 2008 Sichuan earthquake. The city was also the scene of a large-scale environmental protest against a copper smelting plant in July 2012.

Names
The area was first known as Zhifang during the Chu-Han Contention that followed the collapse of China's Qin dynasty. Under Wang Mang's Xin dynasty, the area was renamed Meixin County in AD4, but the Bright and Martial Emperor of the restored Han dynasty restored the name Zhifang—with a different character—in AD25. The current name was first adopted in AD221 by the Kingdom of Shu. Under the Northern Zhou, Shifang was known as Fangting or Fangning between 557 and its merger with Luo County sometime between 566 and 576. Between 912 and 919, it was known as Tongji County.

History

Ancient China
The area of present-day Shifang formed part of Western Qiang (Xīqiāng), one of the regions that appear in ancient Chinese records as the birthplace of the famed Yu the Great. The local tourism board has pressed the claim that he was specifically born in Shifang, but similar claims are made by Beichuan, Wenchuan, and Dujiangyan in Sichuan, as well as many other places in other parts of China.

Imperial China
Following the conquest of Shu by Qin, the Qin administrator Li Bing lived in Shifang during his work on the Dujiangyan irrigation system. Some historians make him a native of the area. Following the collapse of Qin, the tiny kingdom of Zhifang was formed in present-day Shifang in 201BC. The area was reconquered by the Martial Emperor of the Han in 111BC and formed part of the Kingdom of Shu during China's Three Kingdoms Period. Under the Northern Zhou, it was merged with Luo County sometime between 566 and 576. It was reëstablished by the Tang in 619. The Chan Buddhist patriarch Mazu Daoyi was born in Shifang's town of Mazu in 709. It formed part of Former Shu between 912 and 919.

In late imperial times, Shifang County was organized as part of the prefecture of Chengdu. Following the Columbian Exchange, it—along with the rest of the plain around Chengdu—became a center of China's tobacco cultivation. In the 19th century, Shifang County was reckoned to have the third-best quality of tobacco, after nearby Pi and Jintang counties.

Modern China
The People's Republic of China made it a county-level city in 1995, placing it under the administration of Deyang.

Shifang was one of the most severely hit cities in the 2008 Sichuan earthquake, with a death toll of 5924. Many of those killed were children, with 13 school buildings totally collapsing in Hongbai, Yinghua, Luoshui, Jiandi, Bajiao, and other towns and dozens of other schools partially collapsing throughout the county. Altogether, 12 teachers and 550 students were killed.

In 2012, high school students organised a protest against the construction of a copper plant in the city that would have caused a significant amount of pollution. The protest was successful at blocking the construction of the factory.

Economy 
Prior to the 2008 earthquake, Shifang had a GDP of 12.7 billion RMB. It was reckoned one of the "100 Small and Medium-Sized Chinese Cities Most Rewarding to Investment" and had been rated the second-best county for growth in Sichuan every year since 1995.

Its status as the "Pearl of Western Sichuan" had been built on its natural resources and productions. It was called "Phosphorite City" from its rich veins of phosphate rock and associated chemical industry and the "Hometown of Chinese Mineral Water" from its natural springs. For over 400 years, the Chengdu plain has been a center of China's tobacco cultivation, with Shifang's produce reckoned among the best. At a time when most of China took tobacco in the form of snuff, the people of Sichuan were rolling it into a form of cigar. Shifang's were given as tribute to the Guangxu Emperor during the Qing and to Mao Zedong and other Communist leaders in the 1950s, earning the town the nickname of the "Hometown of the Chinese Cigar".

In 2008, Beijing Municipality planned to coördinate with Shifang City during its construction of a  capital industry park at Luoshui. The road which will link the Chengdu-Mianyang Expressway and Shifang City will be completed in 2008.  In addition, a new Chengdu-Shifang-Mianyang Expressway and the Chengdu-Lanzhou High-speed Railway, which will pass through Shifang, are scheduled to complete  around 2011, and will make it possible to travel from Chengdu to Shifang in 30 minutes. With the leadership of Chinese government and support of international community, the government of Shifang City plans to complete reconstruction until 2011, make GDP recover to same of 2007 until 2013, and make the city to be a modernized city until 2018.

The cigar industry is undergoing a revival with an investment of €85 million by China Tobacco Chuanyu Industrial Corporation, the owner of Great Wall-brand cigars, in partnership with the Dutch cigar maker Agio, in a cigar complex that is expected to be finished by 2013 and will be capable of churning out two billion cigars a year.

A $1.64 billion copper and molybdenum processing plant is planned by the HTC for the Shifang Economic Development Zone. The project has become controversial, due to environmental reasons. The project further provoked a demonstration of local residents demanding cancellation of the project on 2 July 2012. After violent clashes between the public and the police and nationwide campaigns on the Internet, the project was finally dropped.

Tourism

Places of Interest 
 Yinghua Mountain (蓥华山)
 Western Surprise Happy Valley (西部惊奇欢乐谷), unrelated to Happy Valley (amusement parks)
 Luohan Temple (罗汉寺)
 Li Bing Cenotaph (李冰陵)
 Shifang Longju Temple (什邡龙居寺)

Speciality foods 
Shifang Salted Duck (什邡板鸭)
Hongbai Dried Tofu (红白豆腐干)
Shifang Rice Noodles (什邡米粉)

Administrative divisions 
Shifang has two subdistricts and eight towns.

Subdistricts
Fangting
Zaojiao
Towns:
Luoshui
Hefeng
Mazu
Majing
Yinghua
Nanquan
Jiandi
Shigu
Some towns like Shuangsheng (双盛镇) has been merged in 2019 according to the authority.

Climate

Notes

References

External links 
 Official website of Shifang

Deyang
County-level cities in Sichuan